Journey of Souls may refer to:

 Journey of Souls (album), a 2008 album by Norwegian symphonic power metal band Keldian
 Journey of Souls, a book on regression by Michael Newton